Pitch Black (titled The Chronicles of Riddick: Pitch Black on later re-releases) is a 2000 American science fiction action-horror film directed by David Twohy and co-written by Twohy and brothers Ken and Jim Wheat from a story conceived by the latter. The film stars Vin Diesel, Radha Mitchell, Cole Hauser, and Keith David. Dangerous criminal Richard B. Riddick (Diesel) is being transported to prison in a spacecraft, and escapes when the spaceship is damaged by comet debris and crash lands on an empty desert planet. When predatory creatures begin attacking the survivors, Riddick joins forces with them to escape the planet.

Pitch Black was the final film credit of PolyGram Filmed Entertainment, which merged with Universal Pictures during production. It was shot on a modest budget of US$23 million and received mixed reviews from critics, who praised some promising story elements, the visual style, and Diesel's performance, but criticized the lack of exploration of the alien world and recycled human conflicts. It was a sleeper hit, grossing over $53 million worldwide, and started a franchise centered on the antihero Riddick. A sequel, The Chronicles of Riddick, was released in 2004 by Universal, with Diesel back as the title character and Twohy returning as writer and director. A third film, titled Riddick, was released in 2013, with Diesel and Twohy reuniting again.

Plot
In the distant future, the spaceship Hunter-Gratzner is transporting passengers in cryostasis. Among them is Abu "Imam" al-Walid, a Muslim priest guiding three young pilgrims to New Mecca; a teenager named Jack; a pair of prospectors named Shazza and Zeke; a rich merchant named Paris; and a bounty hunter posing as a law enforcement officer, William J. Johns, who is escorting notorious criminal Richard B. Riddick. Riddick has surgically modified eyes that are highly sensitive to light. Micrometeoroids rupture the ship's hull, killing the captain and sending the ship off course. The ship's first officer, Owens, and the docking pilot, Carolyn Fry, attempt to land the ship on a nearby planet. As the ship falls apart, Fry decides to dump the passenger section to reduce weight, but Owens stops her. The vessel crashes into the planet's surface, most of the passengers are killed, and Owens is fatally wounded. Riddick escapes into the desert despite Johns' attempts to keep him restrained.

The survivors explore their surroundings, noticing that the planet's three suns keep it in perpetual daylight. They find an abandoned geological research settlement, with a water well and a dropship that lacks power to fly. Zeke goes missing, and Riddick is suspected; while searching for Zeke, Fry escapes from aggressive photosensitive creatures after finding his remains in their cave. Johns recaptures Riddick and offers him a deal: if he helps the survivors escape the planet, Johns will allow him to go free. The group takes a power cell to the dropship. One of the young pilgrims is ambushed and eaten while exploring the settlement. An orrery shows that an eclipse is imminent and the creatures will be free to hunt above ground.  They realize the geologists must have been all killed by the creatures during the last eclipse. Johns informs Fry that Riddick is a capable pilot and could abandon them, and Riddick reveals that Johns is actually a bounty hunter and morphine addict who denied Owens the drug in his final moments.

The group returns to the crash site on a solar-powered sand truck to salvage more power cells for the dropship before the eclipse, but it begins as they get there. Creatures pour out of the ground and devour Shazza and another pilgrim. With his enhanced sight, Riddick agrees to lead the group to the dropship on foot through the darkness. They build a rig from the ship's lighting rods as protection; Paris accidentally destroys the rig and is devoured. Riddick reveals to the group that Jack is female and the scent of her menstrual blood is drawing the attention of the creatures; Johns suggests to Riddick that they use her as bait. Instead, Riddick fights and wounds Johns and leaves him as a distraction. The rest of the group pushes on as Riddick drags the power cells behind him.

After Imam's last acolyte is killed and rainfall starts putting out their improvised torches, Riddick hides the others in a cave and goes to start the dropship himself. Inside the cave, the group discovers bioluminescent worms, which they stuff in bottles to use as light. Fry leaves the cave and finds Riddick powering the ship, ready to leave. She pleads with him to help her rescue the others, but instead he offers to take her with him. Riddick is soon persuaded to return after Fry answers his question that she would die for them, and they retrieve Imam and Jack, but Riddick is separated and wounded by the predators; Fry goes back for him but a creature stabs and carries her off. Riddick makes it to the ship and delays engaging the engines to incinerate as many creatures as possible. In space, Jack asks Riddick what they should tell the authorities about him; he tells her to say that Riddick died on the planet.

Cast
Vin Diesel as Richard B. Riddick. A former mercenary, soldier and pilot, turned infamous criminal and murderer.  Riddick has surgically altered eyes that allow him to see in the dark but cause him immense pain in light; he wears goggles at all times to protect them.
Radha Mitchell as Carolyn Fry, a docking pilot for the transport ship Hunter-Gratzner. She has a moment of weakness during the emergency landing and tries to sacrifice the ship's passenger section to save herself. Her regret over this decision causes her to become obsessed with getting the survivors off the planet.
Cole Hauser as William J. Johns, a bounty hunter and morphine addict posing as a lawman.  He is exceptionally selfish and willing to do whatever he can to save his own hide.
Rhiana Griffith as Jack, a young girl who disguises herself as a boy to fit in.  She idolizes Riddick, and shaves her head and wears goggles to copy his look.
Keith David as Abu "Imam" al-Walid, a devout Muslim who is travelling to New Mecca.  He is accompanied by three boys named Ali, Hassan, and Sulieman.
Lewis Fitz-Gerald as Paris P. Ogilvie, an antiques dealer who sells weaponry and art.
Claudia Black as Sharon "Shazza" Montgomery, a free settler who is travelling across the universe looking for a new home.
John Moore as John "Zeke" Ezekiel, Shazza's companion.
Simon Burke as Greg Owens, First Officer of the Hunter-Gratzner. During the ship's emergency landing, he stops Fry from dumping the passengers.
Les Chantery as Suleiman
Sam Sari as Hassan
Firass Dirani as Ali
Ric Anderson as Total Stranger, a surviving passenger shot dead by Zeke, who mistakes him for Riddick.
Vic Wilson as Captain Tom Mitchell, who dies in the crash of the Hunter-Gratzner.
Angela Moore as Dead Crew Member

Production
According to Ken and Jim Wheat, the original concept of Pitch Black was suggested by David Madden during his tenure in Interscope Communications. His initial premise was: “[t]ravelers visit a planet where multiple suns mean perpetual daylight, but when an eclipse brings darkness, ghosts emerge.” These "ghost" antagonists survived the first draft, but were later replaced by physical predators. Interscope approached David Twohy with the concept, letting him direct if he could refine the screenplay. Twohy had worked on an early version of Alien 3, and was aware that Pitch Black concept had similarities to that franchise. He proposed changes to character arcs in the script. Said Twohy: 

Most of the filming, including all of the external locations, took place in and around Coober Pedy, South Australia. It was winter in the region, and rain before the shoot caused filming delays. Most interior sequences were shot at the Village Roadshow Studios, in Oxenford, Queensland. In Los Angeles, New Deal Studios were used for miniature photography and the interior sequence of the spaceship crash. To highlight the different suns for some of the daytime sequences, the filmmakers used a bleach bypass process during post-production.

Reception

Pitch Black opened in 1,832 theaters on 18 February 2000, grossing $11,577,688 over its opening weekend and ranking 4th at the box office. The film has a domestic gross of $39,240,659 and an international gross of $13,947,000, giving it a worldwide total of $53,187,659.

Critical response
At review aggregation website Rotten Tomatoes, it has a 59% approval rating based on 113 reviews, with an average rating of 5.70/10. The site's consensus reads: "Despite an interesting premise (and a starmaking turn from Vin Diesel), Pitch Black is too derivative and formulaic to fully recommend to sci-fi or action fans". On Metacritic, the film has a weighted average score of 49 out of 100, based on 29 critics, indicating "mixed or average reviews".

James Berardinelli of ReelViews gave the film 3 out of 4 stars and stated, "It's not an especially challenging part, but Diesel handles it with aplomb." BBC.com gave the film 3 out of 5 stars and stated it as "an entertainment and quite a good one too." Peter Bradshaw of Guardian gave the film a positive review and stated that the film "undoubtedly has something interesting about it, and that something can be summarized in two words: Vin Diesel." Nathan Rabin of A.V. Club gave the film a positive review and stated that the film "falters a bit in its last half-hour" and "reduces Diesel to delivering a pithy one-liner-but for the most part, it's terrific."

San Francisco Chronicle gave the film 0 out of 4 stars and called the film "a tiresome experience." Austin Chronicle gave the film 2 out of 5 stars and called the film "a very streamlined exercise in interplanetary mayhem and the logistics of the body count." Roger Ebert of Chicago Sun-Times gave the film 2 out of 4 stars and stated that "how sad it is that humans travel countless light years away from Earth, only to find themselves inhabiting the same tired generic conventions."

Accolades

Home media
Pitch Black was released on VHS and DVD on October 10, 2000. It was re-released on DVD in 2004 as The Chronicles of Riddick: Pitch Black. It was released on HD DVD on July 11, 2006, and on Blu-ray on March 31, 2009. The disc contains the theatrical edition and an unrated director's cut edition, containing 3 more minutes of extra material. A LaserDisc release was also planned, but cancelled by mid-2001 due to waning support for that format.

Expanded franchise

Sequels 
The movie's sequel, The Chronicles of Riddick (2004), was also directed by David Twohy. To tie in with the sequel, the film was novelized under the name The Chronicles of Riddick: Pitch Black, which was written by Frank Lauria.

A short animated movie released the same year, The Chronicles of Riddick: Dark Fury (2004), was directed by Peter Chung. Dark Fury bridges the gap between Pitch Black and Chronicles of Riddick.

Riddick, a live-action sequel to The Chronicles of Riddick, opened on September 6, 2013, with both David Twohy and Vin Diesel attached. The sequel ties in more closely to the original Pitch Black.

Riddick: Furya, the fourth installment was announced in February 2023. Vin Diesel will again appear in the film and David Twohy has written the script and will direct the film.

Prequel 
Into Pitch Black (2000) is a Sci-Fi channel special that includes clips from Pitch Black and takes place before and after the events of the film. Inconsistencies with the storyline of later sequels have made it non-canonical.

Video games 
The Chronicles of Riddick: Escape from Butcher Bay, a game for the Xbox and the PC, was also released in 2004 to critical acclaim. A remake of Butcher Bay, including a new campaign, was released for the Xbox 360, PlayStation 3 and PC on 7 April 2009, under the title The Chronicles of Riddick: Assault on Dark Athena.

See also
 List of films featuring eclipses

References

External links

 
 
 
 
 
 
 . (Online chat transcript) SciFi.com, February 16, 2000. Archived from the original on June 14, 2004.

The Chronicles of Riddick (franchise)
2000 films
2000s science fiction horror films
2000 independent films
2000s monster movies
2000 science fiction action films
American science fiction action films
American science fiction horror films
American space adventure films
American monster movies
Films directed by David Twohy
Films shot in South Australia
Films set in deserts
Films set in the 27th century
Films set on fictional planets
Interscope Communications films
PolyGram Filmed Entertainment films
American science fiction thriller films
Films scored by Graeme Revell
Gramercy Pictures films
Fiction set on desert planets
Films with screenplays by David Twohy
USA Films films
Universal Pictures films
Films shot at Village Roadshow Studios
2000s English-language films
2000s American films